When Danger Calls is a 1927 American silent thriller film directed by Charles Hutchison and starring William Fairbanks, Eileen Sedgwick and Ethan Laidlaw.

Cast
 William Fairbanks as Ralph Spencer 
 Eileen Sedgwick as June Weldon 
 Ethan Laidlaw as James Gwyn 
 Sally Long as Eva Gwyn 
 Donald MacDonald as George Marsden 
 Hank Mann as Tommy Schultz

References

Bibliography
 Munden, Kenneth White. The American Film Institute Catalog of Motion Pictures Produced in the United States, Part 1. University of California Press, 1997.

External links
 

1927 films
1920s thriller films
1920s English-language films
American silent feature films
American thriller films
Films directed by Charles Hutchison
American black-and-white films
Gotham Pictures films
Silent thriller films
1920s American films